Cadley can refer to:

 Cadley, Lancashire, a suburb of Preston, England
 Cadley, Collingbourne Ducis, Wiltshire, England
 Cadley, Savernake, Wiltshire, England
 Cadley, Georgia, an unincorporated community, Georgia, United States

See also
 Cadle (disambiguation)